Finland has competed at every edition of the World Aesthetic Group Gymnastics Championships since its inception in 2000. In fact, the first edition of World Championships in Aesthetic group gymnastics was held in Helsinki, Finland. It has been the second most successful nation at the global competition for Aesthetic group gymnastics. By the end of the 2022 World Championships, its gymnasts had won a total of 45 medals, being the most successful nation. As one of the foremost nations in the sport internationally, its delegation for the championships are among the largest.

Medal table

Multiple medalists

Senior

Results

Senior

References

External links
 International Federation of Aesthetic Group Gymnastics 
 Finnish Gymnastics Federation

Gymnastics in Finland